
Gmina Somianka is a rural gmina (administrative district) in Wyszków County, Masovian Voivodeship, in east-central Poland.

Villages
Gmina Somianka contains the villages and settlements of:
 Barcice
 Celinowo
 Henrysin
 Huta Podgórna
 Jackowo Dolne
 Jackowo Górne
 Janki
 Jasieniec
 Kręgi
 Michalin
 Nowe Kozłowo
 Nowe Płudy
 Nowe Wypychy
 Ostrowy
 Popowo-Letnisko
 Popowo-Parcele
 Skorki
 Somianka (including the sołectwos of Somianka Zaszosie and Somianka-Parcele)
 Stare Kozłowo
 Stare Płudy
 Stare Wypychy
 Stary Mystkówiec
 Suwin
 Ulasek
 Wielątki Rosochate
 Wielęcin
 Wola Mystkowska
 Wólka Somiankowska
 Zdziebórz

Neighbouring gminas
Gmina Somianka is bordered by the gminas of Dąbrówka, Rząśnik, Serock, Wyszków and Zatory.

References

Polish official population figures 2006

Somianka
Wyszków County